Arvo Ala-Pöntiö (20 September 1942 – 7 October 1997) was a Finnish weightlifter. He competed at the 1972 Summer Olympics and the 1976 Summer Olympics.

References

External links
 

1942 births
1997 deaths
Finnish male weightlifters
Olympic weightlifters of Finland
Weightlifters at the 1972 Summer Olympics
Weightlifters at the 1976 Summer Olympics
People from Kalajoki
Sportspeople from North Ostrobothnia
20th-century Finnish people